Katarina Kolar is a Croatian football striker currently playing for BV Cloppenburg in the 2. Bundesliga and the Croatian national team. She has also played for ŽNK Osijek and Plamen Križevci in Croatia and Austria Kärnten in the Austrian Frauenliga.

International career
Kolar made her international senior debut on 16 in October 2006 in a 3-0 friendly win over Macedonia. She is the Croatian team's top scorer with 14 goals as of September 2014.

International goals

References

External links

Katarina Kolar at UEFA's website

1989 births
Living people
Croatian women's footballers
Croatia women's international footballers
Expatriate women's footballers in Austria
Expatriate women's footballers in Germany
Women's association football forwards
ÖFB-Frauenliga players
2. Frauen-Bundesliga players
Croatian Women's First Football League players
ŽNK Osijek players
ŽNK Dinamo-Maksimir players
Croatian expatriate women's footballers
Croatian expatriate sportspeople in Germany
Croatian expatriate sportspeople in Austria